Franco D. Pillarella is a Canadian career diplomat.  He is most known for his testimony into the deportation and imprisonment of Maher Arar, which occurred during his tenure as Canadian ambassador to Syria.

Early life and career 

Pillarella earned a B.A. from the University of Ottawa, in 1963; he went on to obtain an LL.B from the same institution in 1966 and was called to the Quebec Bar in 1967.  He joined the Foreign Service later that year.

He has served abroad in Bonn, Milan, Rome, Algiers, The Hague and, from 1988 to 1992, as Consul-General in Berlin.

In Ottawa, he held a number of positions, including Director, Human Rights and Social Affairs Division, and Director, Foreign Intelligence Division. Since 1997, he has served as ambassador to Algeria.

On July 27, 2000 Pillarella was appointed ambassador to the Syrian Arab Republic with concurrent accreditation as High Commissioner to the Republic of Cyprus.

As of June 2005, he is testifying in Ottawa at the inquiry looking into the arrest and deportation of Maher Arar to Syria in the fall of 2002.

Testimony at Arar Inquiry 

During his June 15, 2005 testimony at the inquiry into Maher Arar's deportation and imprisonment, Pillarella claimed he had no conclusive reason to believe Arar was being tortured, and admitted to accepting the word of Syrian officials that he was not.

He further claimed that he had no reason to think that human rights abuses were occurring in Syria during his term as ambassador, claiming that "I did not have any indication that there were serious human rights abuses committed, that I could verify."

These statements prompted widespread shock and incredulity in Canadian media. Paul Heinbecker, former Canadian ambassador to the United Nations, stated that Syria's human rights abuses were well known and well documented by many sources.

See also
 Extraordinary rendition

References 
 Arar inquiry told Canadians were 'beggars, not choosers', CBC News, 15 June 2005
 Sharp rebuke for ambassador at Arar inquiry, CBC News, 16 June 2005

External links 
Government of Canada - Commission of Inquiry into the Actions of Canadian Officials in Relation to Maher Arar
Maher Arar's official site 
Official Government of Canada message to Romania

Living people
University of Ottawa alumni
Ambassadors of Canada to Syria
Ambassadors of Canada to Romania
Ambassadors of Canada to Bulgaria
Ambassadors of Canada to Moldova
High Commissioners of Canada to Cyprus
Ambassadors of Canada to Algeria
Year of birth missing (living people)